Shalabee Ibrahim (born March 30, 1997) is a Maldivian singer. Born in Mulah, Maldives, his career began upon participating in the reality show Maldivian Idol (2016), in which he was awarded as the first runner up of the show.

Early life and career

1997–2012: School life
Shalabee Ibrahim studied from Al-Madhrasathul Arabiyyathul Islamiyya. He was a prefect and participated in several Quran reciting competitions. He participated in the National Quran Competition for more than 9 times and has repeatedly being awarded; also winning the 2nd place from the whole competition once. Regarding his studies, Ibrahim said; "It was good till grade 9. Afterwards, I quit. I always have to get ready for the exams after memorising something. I never understand it to that extent, and there is a lack of interest". After completing grade 9, he found a new interest in boduberu and started performing boduberu along with some of his friends.

2015–present: Maldivian Idol and beyond
In 2015, Ibrahim participated in the Boduberu Challenge, where he was the lead singer of the boduberu group Dhammaanu. At the end of the show, he was awarded as the best singer of the season. The same year, he auditioned for the first season of Maldivian Idol and was chosen as the first runner-up of the show. A while after the results were declared, Shalabee’s manager Ali Amir refused to accept the results of the show and demanded to publicize the results of votes. However, a day later the team decided to move forward with the agreement that was made along with Public Service Media, which involves talent managing programs for a span of two years.

On 30 June 2016, Ibrahim released his first studio album. Titled Hidhaaee Noor, it was an album of hymns and was launched by Maumoon Abdul Gayoom who also penned lyrics for one of the songs from the album.

Philanthropy
Besides his career in music, Ibrahim has also showed interest in contributing to various charities. In 2016, he decided to cover study related costs of a special needs child for 1 year.

Discography

Feature film

Non-film songs

Studio albums

Filmography

References 

1997 births
Living people
People from Malé